Haley Augello is an American freestyle wrestler who competed at the 2016 Olympics.

She is a 2013 graduate of Lockport Township High School.

She won two college national championships for King University.

In 2016 Augello won the American trials at the 48 kg category.

At the 2016 World Wrestling Olympic Qualification Tournament 1 she finished in 2nd to qualify for the Olympics.

At the 2016 Olympic Games in Rio she finished 7th overall in women's 48 kilogram freestyle wrestling.

References

American female sport wrestlers
Living people
American sportswomen
Wrestlers at the 2016 Summer Olympics
Olympic wrestlers of the United States
Year of birth missing (living people)
21st-century American women